This is a list of seasons completed by the Milwaukee Bucks of the National Basketball Association (NBA). The Bucks joined the NBA as an expansion team in the  season. Milwaukee's 1971 NBA title in their 3rd year of existence marks the Bucks as the fastest team ever to go from being an entirely new franchise to being an NBA champion. With their 2021 title, the Bucks are now the only NBA franchise to win championships while having been in both the Western (1971) and Eastern (2021) conferences.

Seasons

References

 
Seasons